The 1995 Troy State Trojans football team represented Troy State University—now known as Troy University—as an independent during the 1995 NCAA Division I-AA football season. Led by fifth-year head coach Larry Blakeney, the Trojans compiled a record of 11–1. After the first undefeated regular season in program history, Troy State advanced to the NCAA Division I-AA Football Championship playoffs for the third consecutive season, but lost to Georgia Southern in the first round. The Trojans were ranked No. 3 in the final Sports Network poll. The team played home games at Veterans Memorial Stadium in Troy, Alabama.

Schedule

References

Troy State
Troy Trojans football seasons
Troy State Trojans football